Nick's (Nick's Tavern) was a tavern and jazz club located at the northwest corner of 10th Street and 7th Avenue in the Greenwich Village neighborhood of the borough of Manhattan, New York City, which was at its peak in the 1940s and 1950s.

Many jazz artists performed at the club including Bill Saxton (a Friday night regular), Pee Wee Russell, Muggsy Spanier, Miff Mole, and Joe Grauso, among others. Artists like Miles Davis and John Coltrane used to visit the pub to relax after their own gigs. During the early 1950s, the club was noted for its regular Phil Napoleon and The Original Memphis Five Dixieland performances.

See also
 St. Nick's Pub  
 List of jazz venues

References

External links
Official site
Jim Cullum Riverwalk Jazz Collection at Stanford University

1940 establishments in New York City
Jazz clubs in New York City
Music venues in Manhattan
Taverns in New York (state)
Greenwich Village
Music venues completed in 1940